David Max Marsh  (April 1934 – 19 August 2022) was a British amateur golfer who was better known for serving as the chairman of Everton Football Club.

Marsh was named captain of The Royal and Ancient Golf Club of St Andrews in 1990, having previously been president of the Lancashire and then English Unions between 1973 and 1975. He was the youngest captain of Southport and Ainsdale Golf Club in 1967.

Having played Rugby Union at school, Marsh joined Southport Rugby Football Club in 1957, and regularly ran out for the First XV.

Marsh won the English Amateur in 1964 and 1970, and represented England on 75 occasions. He also participated in the Walker Cup, being a member of the victorious Great Britain and Ireland team in 1971. He went on to captain the team in 1973 and 1975.

Marsh became the chairman of Everton F.C. in 1991, succeeding Philip Carter. Whilst in this position he courted with controversy over his appointment of Norwich City manager Mike Walker as Everton boss. He was succeeded by Peter Johnson in 1994.

He was appointed Member of the Order of the British Empire (MBE) in the 2011 New Year Honours for voluntary service to amateur golf.

Marsh died in August 2022, at the age of 88.

Team appearances
 Walker Cup (representing Great Britain & Ireland): 1959, 1971 (winners), 1973 (non-playing captain), 1975 (non-playing captain)
 Amateurs–Professionals Match (representing the Amateurs): 1959
 St Andrews Trophy (representing Great Britain & Ireland): 1958 (winners)
 European Amateur Team Championship (representing England): 1971 (winners)

References

English male golfers
Amateur golfers
Sportspeople from Southport
Members of the Order of the British Empire
English football chairmen and investors
Everton F.C. directors and chairmen
1934 births
2022 deaths